Herpyllus propinquus, the western parson spider, is a species of ground spider in the family Gnaphosidae that occurs in North America.

References

External links

 

Gnaphosidae
Articles created by Qbugbot
Spiders described in 1887